The choroid consists mainly of a dense capillary plexus, and of small arteries and veins carrying blood to and returning it from this plexus.

On its external surface is a thin membrane, the suprachoroid lamina, composed of delicate non-vascular lamellae—each lamella consisting of a network of fine elastic fibers among which are branched pigment cells.

During embryological development, it is derived from the neural crest.

The spaces between the lamellae are lined by endothelium, and open freely into the perichoroidal lymph space, which, in its turn, communicates with the periscleral space by the perforations in the sclera through which the vessels and nerves are transmitted.

See also
 suprachoroidal drug delivery

References 

Human eye anatomy